is a Japanese romance anime television series produced by Feel. It originally aired from April 6 to June 29, 2017. Crunchyroll has licensed the series in North America.

As a coming-of-age contemporary romance, the story follows the lives of two junior high school students, Akane and Kotarō, who fall in love for the first time and struggle to maintain their relationship.

Plot
Kotaro Azumi and Akane Mizuno become third year students at junior high school and are classmates for the first time. They are put in charge of the equipment for a sports festival and slowly grow closer via LINE. These two, along with fellow students Chinatsu Nishio and Takumi Hira, relate to their peers through mutual understandings and feelings. As their final year at junior high school progresses, the group overcome their challenges to mature and become aware of changes in themselves.

Characters

Main

Student of class 3-1 who belongs to the literature club. He's aiming to become a novelist and respects Osamu Dazai. He generally has a calm and composed attitude. He initially is too embarrassed to show his novels to other people, but upon learning Akane's love for running and openness to use embarrassment as a method of improving oneself, he begins to open up to that prospect. From early childhood, Kotarō has received instruction in the performance of traditional dance and festival music accompaniment, Hayashi, at a local Shinto shrine. He secretly starts dating Akane, but later reveals this to Takumi.
When Akane is forced to move to Chiba due to her father's work, Kotarō tries to get into the same school as her, despite his parents' objections, but is unsuccessful. He is unable to see Akane off on her moving day, but publishes an online story promising to love her forever. Despite their long-distance relationship, they are shown to still get in contact and visit each other. The final shot at the end of the anime shows them married with a child years later.

Student of class 3-1 who belongs to the track and field club. She's an easy going character, but can be self-conscious and timid at times. When feeling nervous, she would squeeze her potato mascot plushie. Akane moved to Kawagoe, Saitama when she was a fifth grader in Primary school. She secretly starts dating Kotarō, but later reveals this to Chinatsu and Takumi, who inform the class about that.
When she is forced to move to Chiba due to her father's work, she becomes anxious over her future relationship with Kotarō, but cheers him on as he tries to get into the same school as her. When Kotarō fails to get in, she again becomes anxious, but finds new hope when she reads his online story, which is a promise to love her forever. The final shot at the end of the anime shows them married with a child years later.

The president of track and field club. He's been in love with Akane since first year.

One of Akane's best friends in track and field club who's easy going. She begins to catch feelings for Azumi.

Class 3-1
Daichi Ogasawara

One of Kotarō's best friends who is in the school's judo club. He laments his lack of popularity with girls which he attributes to the membership of the judo club.
Roman Yamashina

One of Kotarō's best friends who has easy going personality and constantly wanting to read Kotarō's novel, despite of the latter's rejection. He's in love with his homeroom teacher Ryōko and won't hesitate to show it.
Aira Miyamoto

Akane's friend in class 3-1 who's belonged in the tennis club. She falls for Kaneko and dates him.
Setsuko Satō

Akane's friend in class 3-1 who is dating Nagahara. She constantly pays for the fees whenever her boyfriend brings her to a love hotel, even during their school trip to Kyoto.
Miu Imazu

Akane's friend in class 3-1. She has a somewhat black-hearted personality and always henpecks Inaba.
Sakura Tanaka

A bespectacled girl in class 3-1 who always fantasizes about being popular with the boys, despite her plain looks.
Shō Nagahara

Setsuko's boyfriend. A flashy boy who always brings his girlfriend to a love hotel and makes her pay.
Yasuhito Inaba

Miu's "boyfriend", the status of which is often questioned by Inaba himself because of Miu's henpecking.
Aoi Takizawa

A member of the school's track team. She is popular with both girls and boys, but she adopts a hostile attitude towards boys in general and displays no interest in romance.
Tsubasa Kaneko

A member of the school's baseball team in class 3-1 who manages to make Aira fall for him. He is skilled in dealing with his girlfriend's jealousy.
Daisuke Tachibana

The employee of a bookshop that Kotarou frequents. He reads Kotarou's novels and gives helpful advice on both novel writing and romance.
Ryōko Sonoda

Class 3-1's homeroom teacher. She is in love with Roman and struggles to wait until his graduation to express her love. She is also the target of affection of Hidaka-sensei.

Others
Ryūnosuke Azumi

Kotarou's father. Supports his son's novel writing aspirations.
Junko Azumi

Kotarou's mother. Does not want Kotarou to write novels or take Akane's high school entrance examination.
Hiroshi Mizuno

Akane and Ayane's father, who is protective of his daughters, but he is also shown to be accepting of their boyfriends once he gets to know them better.
Saori Mizuno

Akane and Ayane's mother.
Ayane Mizuno

Akane's elder sister who is currently in high school. She is dating Kasai, an aspiring carpenter.

Production and development
An original anime television series produced by Feel was announced in January 2017. Seiji Kishi directed the anime while Yūko Kakihara penned and supervised the series' scripts, and Kazuaki Morita adapted Loundraw's original character designs. Takurō Iga and FlyingDog composed and produced the music, respectively, while Nagano served as the series' producer. It aired on April 6, 2017 on Tokyo MX with further broadcasts on MBS, BS11 and TVA then ended on June 29, 2017. Tōyama also performed the insert song for episode 3, .

Crunchyroll licensed the series and streamed it outside of Asia, and Funimation dubbed the series and released it on home video in North America as part of their partnership with Crunchyroll.

Episode list
All episodes are named after notable works in Japanese literature.

Notes

References

External links
  
 
 
best recommended romantic anime at the flixprime

2017 anime television series debuts
Anime with original screenplays
Crunchyroll anime
Feel (animation studio)
Funimation
Romance anime and manga
School life in anime and manga
Tokyo MX original programming